Cytharomorula lefevreiana is a species of sea snail, a marine gastropod mollusk in the family Muricidae, the murex snails or rock snails.

Description

Distribution
THis species occurs in the Indian Ocean off Mauritius and Réunion.

References

 Houart R. (2013) Revised classification of a group of small species of Cytharomorula Kuroda, 1953 (Muricidae: Ergalataxinae) from the Indo-West Pacific. Novapex 14(2): 25-34
Description of new genera and new species of Ergalataxinae (Gastropoda: Muricidae). Novapex 20(HS 12): 1-5

External links
 Tapparone Canefri C. (1881). Glanures dans la faune malacologique de l'Ile Maurice. Catalogue de la famille des Muricidés. 100 pp., 2 pls.

Gastropods described in 1880
Cytharomorula